"White Limozeen" is a song co-written and recorded by American country music artist Dolly Parton.  It was released in April 1990 as the fifth single and title track from the album White Limozeen.  The song reached #29 on the Billboard Hot Country Singles & Tracks chart.  The song was written by Parton and Mac Davis.

Chart performance

References

1990 singles
1989 songs
Dolly Parton songs
Songs written by Mac Davis
Songs written by Dolly Parton
Song recordings produced by Ricky Skaggs
Columbia Records singles